Dan Zetterström (born 1 June 1954) is a  Swedish ornithologist and bird artist. He is best known as a co-author of the  Collins Bird Guide, with Killian Mullarney, Lars Svensson and Peter J. Grant.  He has designed several series of Swedish stamps.

He has contributed to the following titles:
 Collins Bird Guide, with Killian Mullarney, Lars Svensson and Peter Grant
  Handbook of Bird Identification, Mark Beaman and Steve Madge
  Country Life Guides, Birds of Britain and Europe, Håkan Delin et al.
  Handbook of the Birds of Europe The Middle East and North Africa (Birds of the Western Palearctic), S. Cramp et al.

References

1954 births
Swedish artists
Swedish illustrators
Living people
Swedish bird artists